Husk is a 2011 American horror film. It stars Devon Graye, C. J. Thomason, Tammin Sursok and Ben Easter. It was directed by Brett Simmons and was one of eight films released in 2011 as part of After Dark Films' premiere of their "After Dark Originals" sub-label.

Plot

Chris, Scott, Johnny, Brian and his girlfriend Natalie are driving through rural Nebraska, when a flock of crows attacks their SUV, causing it to crash and knocking everyone unconscious. They wake up and discover Johnny's missing, so Natalie and Chris stay with the car while Brian and Scott enter a cornfield to search a nearby farmhouse for him. In the field, they find a scarecrow mounted in a clearing and a rusted and derelict car, with its windshield also covered in crow carcasses. They arrive at the house, which is seemingly abandoned and in a state of decay despite a light shining from an upstairs window. At the car, Natalie sees a young boy run into the cornfield and chases him but stumbles upon a foul-smelling scarecrow, lying at the edge of the field. She discovers human remains under the scarecrow's clothes and runs into the field to find Brian. Brian and Scott enter the lit upstairs room and find a mutilated, undead Johnny sewing pieces of burlap together at an antique machine. He suddenly stops sewing and the room goes dark just as Natalie's scream is heard from outside. Chris, who's followed Natalie, sees her get attacked and pulled away into the corn. Brian runs outside and into the cornfield, where he and Chris eventually find Natalie's lifeless body strung up in the clearing. Chris flees in terror after seeing a strange force enter Natalie's eyes. Brian spots movement in the corn and tackles the "murderer", only to find that it's a lifeless scarecrow. A second scarecrow attacks him, stabbing his shoulder, it pulls the tackled scarecrow away as Brian runs towards the house.

At the house, Brian blames Chris for not helping Natalie and he and Scott leave Chris alone to search the yard for a means of escape. Upon entering the barn, Scott hallucinates a farmer physically abusing his teenage son (Corey) in front of his other "favorite" son (Alex) but Brian does not share the vision. At the house, is lured to the sewing room by the young boy Natalie saw. An undead Natalie walks in and begins to sew a scarecrow mask. Chris tries to leave but the door's stuck. Hearing his cries for help, Scott and Brian try opening the door, to no avail. Chris manages to escape through the window but falls and is knocked unconscious. Brian is then able to enter the sewing room, but finds it empty.

Later, Scott hallucinates again, this time lured by Corey into the cornfield, where he witnesses Corey kill Alex in a jealous rage with a pitchfork, then dress his body as a scarecrow and leave it in the cornfield, his blood seeping into the ground. Scott wakes from his hallucination and finds himself in the clearing. A scarecrow emerges and attacks Scott, tearing at him with the nails driven into its hands before Brian smashes its head in with an axe. He helps Scott back to the house where Chris admits that he and Natalie also saw a young boy. While Brian searches the house Chris tries to convince Scott that Brian is unstable and that they should leave together in the truck he discovered in the barn. Scott refuses and leaves to find Brian in the house.

In the cellar, Scott and Brian find Corey's remains holding a shotgun, indicating Corey died by suicide. Outside, Chris hot-wires the truck and drives through the cornfield only to be assaulted by several scarecrows. Brian saves him, armed with Corey's shotgun, but is killed by scarecrow Natalie when he can't bring himself to shoot her. Chris returns to the house where Scott has deduced that Alex is the spirit haunting the cornfield and the only time it is safe is when Alex is possessing the body of a new victim and is upstairs sewing a mask since he can only occupy one body at a time. While Alex is busy possessing Brian, Chris and Scott plan to burn down the corn field with gasoline from the cars. However Alex finishes before they can and attacks them with numerous scarecrows. Chris kills several with the shotgun before he and Scott agree to split up to have better chances of survival. As Chris makes his way to the road, he is attacked by scarecrow Brian and impaled on a fence post. He tears Brian's mask in two, breaking Alex's hold over him only to hear another scarecrow closing in. Scott tries to set fire to the field but Alex's original scarecrow knocks him unconscious.

Scott wakes, finding himself in the clearing where Alex has mounted Chris on the scaffold. Remembering his vision, Scott finds the pitchfork used to kill Alex and stabs him repeatedly with it. When Alex gets back up, Chris grabs him, allowing Scott to escape. Alex kills Chris and chases after Scott, who runs towards the road. He emerges from the cornfield and collapses due to his injuries near the SUV. A car drives up and a couple begin searching the SUV, but Scott is unable to call out loud enough to get their attention. Alex emerges from the corn, standing between the couple inspecting the SUV and Scott, and looks back at Scott with a sinister glance before lying down hidden in the tall grass. The couple finally notice Scott and rush toward him, Scott unable to warn them and the credits roll.

Cast
C. J. Thomason as Chris
Devon Graye as Scott
Wes Chatham as Brian
Tammin Sursok as Natalie
Ben Easter as Johnny
Joshua Skipworth as Corey Comstock
Nick Toussaint as Alex Comstock
Mike Cornelison as Farmer Comstock
Aaron Harpold as Local Farmer
Candice Mara Rose as Road Farmer's Wife

Production 
Husk began production as a short film in 2003 that saw its premiere at the 2005 Sundance Film Festival, where it was well received. Director Brett Simmons’ agent then sent the feature length script to After Dark with the short film serving as the pitch for the feature, which was something that Simmons intended when he wrote the short. In an interview with Bloody Disgusting, Simmons said that After Dark gave him plenty of control over the production of his script and the story being told. Filming for the feature length version of the film began in August 2009, with production wrapping 6 years to the day that shooting began for the short film. Simmons cited other scarecrow-themed horror films like Dark Night of the Scarecrow and Jeepers Creepers for serving as his inspiration, though he described the scarecrows in this films as "predators in their natural habitat...they’re Jaws, and you’re in the water".

Release
The film saw its premiere in 2011, released theatrically for a brief time on January 28 along with seven other films produced under the After Dark Originals moniker. It was released shortly after on DVD, distributed by Lionsgate and on Blu-ray, distributed by Cinematic Vision.

Reception

References

External links

2011 films
2011 horror films
2010s supernatural films
American supernatural horror films
Fictional scarecrows
Films set in Nebraska
2010s English-language films
2010s American films